Taj ud-Din Firoz Shah (died 1422), also known as Firoz Shah Bahmani, was the ruler of the Bahmani Sultanate from 16 November 1397 to 22 September 1422. Firuz Shah is considered an important ruler of the Bahamani Sultanate. He expanded his kingdom and even succeeded in conquering the Raichur Doab from Vijaynagara kingdoms.

Firuz Shah fought against the Vijayanagara Empire on many occasions and the rivalry between the two dynasties continued unabated throughout his reign, with victories in 1398 and 1406, but a defeat in 1419.  One of his victories resulted in his marriage to Deva Raya's daughter.

Early life and background 
He was the son of Daud Shah, the fourth sultan, and a grandson of Ala-ud-Din Bahman Shah, the first sultan. He, along with his brother Ahmed, was raised by Muhammad Shah II. Muhammad II married his daughters off to the two brothers. Firuz was deemed the heir presumptive to the throne.

After the birth of Ghiyas-ud-din, Muhammmad deemed him the successor to the throne. Firuz swore fealty to the new sultan. However, Ghiyas-ud-din was blinded and imprisoned by a Turkish nobleman who installed Shams-ud-din as a puppet ruler. Firuz and Ahmed marched to Gulbarga and Firuz declared himself the sultan. Taghalchin was killed and Shams-ud-din was blinded.

Reign 

At the beginning of his reign, Harihara II of the Vijayanagar Empire had advanced as far as the Raichur Doab and posed a threat to the Bahmanis. This threat was thwarted by a calculated and incisive attack by Firuz.

In 1406, he defeated the Vijayanagara Empire. A peace treaty was signed and the daughter of Deva Raya was married off to him.

Firuz led a successful expedition against Narsingh Rai of Kherla who had to surrender forty elephants and married his daughter to Firuz. In 1420, an attack on Pangal, which had been taken by Vijayanagar, proved disastrous. Firuz was trounced by Vijayanagar and he retreated, surrendering the southern and eastern districts of his kingdom. This defeat had a deep impact on his morale and he was henceforth a broken man. He spend his final two years in asceticism and piety.

During his reign, Firuz was successful in integrating Hindus into the Bahmani office and army. He also formed alliances with Telugu warriors.

He was determined to make the Deccan region the cultural centre of India. Each year he sent ships from his kingdom’s two principal western seaports, Goa and Dabhol, to the Persian Gulf to recruit talented men of letters, administrators, soldiers, and artisans.

With the raids of Timur ravaging Delhi, Firuz embarked on building a new city which was named  Firozabad, a few kilometers south of Gulbarga.

He abdicated the throne to his younger brother Ahmad, "considered a saint by both the Muslims and Hindus."

Personality 
Firuz Shah was particularly an intellectual king .He was compared to Muhammad Tughluk in this aspect. He was well versed in Quran and Islamic jurisprudence,took philosophical leanings in Sufism and proficient in several languages and took three days off in a week to give lectures on subjects like mathematics and Euclidean geometry. He was also a master of several languages like Persian, Arabic, Canarese, Telugu, Marathi and many other languages.  He also was poet and wrote under the name of firozi.
His interest in astronomy is quite evident when he instructs to build an observatory in Daulatabad which would get completed after his death.
He was also respectful of other faiths, and read the Christian and Jewish scriptures. He also maintained a vast harem consisting of inmates from different parts of the world. He would also contract temporary marriages known in the Shi'ah doctrine as mutāh so as to not conflict with his strict Islamic observerence.

Death and burial 
Firuz Shah died on 1 October 1422 in Gulbarga. He was buried in a large tomb in the Haft Gumbaz, that was constructed during his lifetime.

References

Bahmani Sultans

Bibliography

1422 deaths